Roine is a medium-sized lake in Finland. The lake is located in the Pirkanmaa region, mostly in the municipality of Kangasala and for a lesser part in the municipality of Pälkäne.

The lake is part of Kokemäenjoki basin and a chain of lakes that consists of Längelmävesi, Vesijärvi, Roine, Pälkänevesi and Mallasvesi. This chain of lakes drains into Vanajavesi in Valkeakoski and from southeast another chain of lakes, consisting of the lakes Lummene, Vehkajärvi, Vesijako, Kuohijärvi, Kukkia, Iso-Roine, Hauhonselkä and Ilmoilanselkä joins into it. In Finnish the former chain of lakes is called Längelmäveden reitti and the latter Hauhon reitti as it runs through the former municipality of Hauho.

In Finnish culture Längelmävesi and Roine are well known as they are mentioned in the famous poem "En sommardag i Kangasala" by Zachris Topelius and have thus became part of Finnish national landscape imagery.

See also
List of lakes in Finland

References

External links
 

Kokemäenjoki basin
Lakes of Kangasala
Lakes of Pälkäne